Jon Irisarri Rincón (born 9 November 1995 in Leaburu) is a Spanish former cyclist, who competed as a professional from 2017 to 2021 for UCI ProTeam .

Major results
2016
 2nd Road race, National Under-23 Road Championships
 4th Overall Volta a Portugal do Futuro

References

External links

1995 births
Living people
Spanish male cyclists
People from Tolosaldea
Cyclists from the Basque Country (autonomous community)
Sportspeople from Gipuzkoa